CIHR-FM is a Canadian radio station broadcasting at 104.7 FM in Woodstock, Ontario. The station plays an adult contemporary format branded as 104.7 Heart FM and is owned by Byrnes Communications Inc. CIHR also broadcasts HD Radio, with the second subchannel playing music from the 70s, 80s and 90s, as well as Christmas music during the holiday season.

History
CIHR-FM signed on the air on April 10, 2006, at 8:00am. On March 17, 2011, the station applied to change the authorized contours by increasing the average effective radiated power from 7,096 watts to 8,950 watts. All other technical parameters would remain unchanged. This application received CRTC approval on November 10, 2011.

References

External links
104.7 Heart FM
 

Ihr
Ihr
Radio stations established in 2004
2004 establishments in Ontario